Barstow Unified School District  is a public school district based in Barstow, which is located in the Mojave Desert, in northern San Bernardino County, California.

References

External links
 

Barstow, California
School districts in San Bernardino County, California